The Malayali people (also spelt Malayalee and sometimes known by the demonym Keralite) are a Dravidian ethnolinguistic group originating from the present-day state of Kerala in India, occupying its southwestern Malabar coast. They are predominantly native speakers of the Malayalam language, one of the six Classical languages in India. The state of Kerala was created in 1956 through the States Reorganisation Act. Prior to that, since the 1800s existed the Kingdom of Cochin, the Kingdom of Travancore, Malabar District, and South Canara of the British India. The Malabar District was annexed by the British through the Third Mysore War (1790–92) from Tipu Sultan. Before that, the Malabar District was under various kingdoms including the Zamorins of Calicut, Kingdom of Tanur, Arakkal kingdom, Kolathunadu, Valluvanad, and Palakkad Rajas.

According to the Indian census of 2011, there are approximately 33 million Malayalis in Kerala, making up 97% of the total population of the state. Malayali minorities are also found in the neighboring state of Tamil Nadu, mainly in Kanyakumari district and Nilgiri district and Dakshina Kannada and Kodagu districts of Karnataka and also in other metropolitan areas of India. Over the course of the later half of the 20th century, significant Malayali communities have emerged in Persian Gulf countries, including the United Arab Emirates (UAE), Bahrain, Saudi Arabia, Oman, Qatar and Kuwait and to a lesser extent, other developed nations with a primarily immigrant background such as Malaysia, Singapore, the United States (US), the United Kingdom (UK), Australia, New Zealand and Canada. As of 2013, there were an estimated 1.6 million ethnic Malayali expatriates worldwide. The estimated population of Malayalees in Malaysia in year 2020 is approximately 348,000, which makes up 12.5% of the total number of Indian population in Malaysia that makes them the second biggest Indian ethnic group in Malaysia, after the Tamils. Most of the Malayalee population in Malaysia aged 18 to 30 are known to be either the third, fourth, or fifth generation living as a Malaysian citizen. According to A. R. Raja Raja Varma, Malayalam was the name of the place, before it became the name of the language spoken by the people.

Etymology
Malayalam, the native language of Malayalis, has its origin from the words mala meaning "mountain" and alam meaning "land" or "locality". Kerala was usually known as Malabar in the foreign trade circles in the medieval era. Earlier, the term Malabar had also been used to denote Tulu Nadu and Kanyakumari which lie contiguous to Kerala in the southwestern coast of India, in addition to the modern state of Kerala. The people of Malabar were known as Malabars. Until the arrival of the East India Company, the term Malabar was used as a general name for Kerala, along with the term Kerala. From the time of Cosmas Indicopleustes (6th century CE) itself, the Arab sailors used to call Kerala as Male. The first element of the name, however, is attested already in the Topography written by Cosmas Indicopleustes. This mentions a pepper emporium called Male, which clearly gave its name to Malabar ('the country of Male'). The name Male is thought to come from the Malayalam word Mala ('hill'). Al-Biruni is the first known writer to call this country Malabar. Authors such as Ibn Khordadbeh and Al-Baladhuri mention Malabar ports in their works. The Arab writers had called this place Malibar, Manibar, Mulibar, and Munibar. Malabar is reminiscent of the word Malanad which means the land of hills. According to William Logan, the word Malabar comes from a combination of the Malayalam word Mala (hill) and the Persian/Arabic word Barr (country/continent). Hence the natives of Malabar Coast were known as Malabarese or Malabari in the foreign trade circles. The words Malayali and Malabari are synonymous to each other. 
The Skanda Purana mentions the ecclesiastical office of the Thachudaya Kaimal who is referred to as Manikkam Keralar (The Ruby King of Kerala), synonymous with the deity of the Koodalmanikyam temple. Hence the term Keralar seem to precede the usage of the word Malayala/Malayalam.

Geographic distribution and population

Malayalam is a language spoken by the native people of southwestern India (from Mangalore to Kanyakumari) and the islands of Lakshadweep in Arabian Sea. According to the Indian census of 2001, there were 30,803,747 speakers of Malayalam in Kerala, making up 93.2% of the total number of Malayalam speakers in India, and 96.7% of the total population of the state. There were a further 701,673 (2.1% of the total number) in Tamil Nadu, 557,705 (1.7%) in Karnataka and 406,358 (1.2%) in Maharashtra. The number of Malayalam speakers in Lakshadweep is 51,100, which is only 0.15% of the total number, but is as much as about 84% of the population of Lakshadweep. In all, Malayalis made up 3.22% of the total Indian population in 2001. Of the total 33,066,392 Malayalam speakers in India in 2001, 33,015,420 spoke the standard dialects, 19,643 spoke the Yerava dialect and 31,329 spoke non-standard regional variations like Eranadan. As per the 1991 census data, 28.85% of all Malayalam speakers in India spoke a second language and 19.64% of the total knew three or more languages. Malayalam was the most spoken language in erstwhile Gudalur taluk (now Gudalur and Panthalur taluks) of Nilgiris district in Tamil Nadu which accounts for 48.8% population and it was the second most spoken language in Mangalore and Puttur taluks of South Canara accounting for 21.2% and 15.4% respectively according to 1951 census report. 25.57% of the total population in the Kodagu district of Karnataka are Malayalis, in which Malayalis form the largest linguistic group in Virajpet Taluk. Around one-third of the Malayalis in Kodagu district speak the Yerava dialect according to the 2011 census, which is native to Kodagu and Wayanad.

Just before independence, Malaya attracted many Malayalis. Large numbers of Malayalis have settled in Chennai (Madras), Delhi, Bangalore, Mangalore, Coimbatore, Hyderabad, Mumbai (Bombay), Ahmedabad and Chandigarh. Many Malayalis have also emigrated to the Middle East, the United States, Canada, Australia, New Zealand and Europe. As of 2009-2013, there were approximately 146,000 people with Malayali heritage in the United States, with an estimated 40,000 living in the New York tri-state area. There were 7,093 Malayalam speakers in Australia in 2006. The 2001 Canadian census reported 7,070 people who listed Malayalam as their mother tongue, mostly in the Greater Toronto Area and Southern Ontario. In 2010, the Census of Population of Singapore reported that there were 26,348 Malayalees in Singapore. The 2006 New Zealand census reported 2,139 speakers. 134 Malayalam speaking households were reported in 1956 in Fiji. There is also a considerable Malayali population in the Persian Gulf regions, especially in Bahrain, Muscat, Doha, Dubai, Abu Dhabi, Kuwait and European region mainly in London. The city of Chennai has the highest population of Malayalis in a metropolitan area outside Kerala, followed by Bangalore.

Besides, the Malayalee citizens in Malaysia are estimated to be 229,800 in the year 2020 whereas the population of the Malayalee expatriates is approximately 2,000. They make up around 10 percent of the total number of Indians in Malaysia.

History and culture

During the ancient period, the people of present-day Kerala were ruled by the Chera dynasty of Tamilakam, with their capital at Vanchi. The dynasty lent the region its name, uniting the entire coast under their suzerainty. The fall of the Cheras in the 15th century CE at the hands of the Cholas proved to be the catalyst of a distinct Malayali identity, wading away from the Tamil cultural sphere of influence over several millennia.

The Malayalis live in a historic area known as the Malabar coast, which for thousands of years has been a major center of the international spice trade, operating at least from the Roman era with Ptolemy documenting it on his map of the world in 150 AD. For that reason, a highly distinct culture was created among the Malayali due to centuries of contact with foreign cultures through the spice trade. The arrival of the Cochin Jews, the rise of Saint Thomas Christians, and the growth of Mappila Muslim community, in particular, were very significant in shaping modern-day Malayali culture. Later, Portuguese Latin Christians, Dutch Malabar, French Mahe, and British English, which arrived after 1498 left their mark through colonialism and pillaging their resources. 

In 2017, a detailed study of the evolution of the Singapore Malayalee community over a period of more than 100 years was published as a book: From Kerala to Singapore: Voices of the Singapore Malayalee Community. It is believed to be the first in-depth study of the presence of a NRI Malayalee community outside of Kerala.

Language and literature

According to scholars, the Malayalam language is descended from a dialect of the Tamil Language spoken on the Malabar coast, and largely arose because of its geographical isolation from the rest of the Tamil speaking areas. The Sangam literature can be considered as the ancient predecessor of Malayalam. Malayalam literature is ancient in origin, and includes such figures as the 14th century Niranam poets (Madhava Panikkar, Sankara Panikkar and Rama Panikkar), whose works mark the dawn of both modern Malayalam language and indigenous Keralite poetry. Some linguists claim that an inscription found from Edakkal Caves, Wayanad, which belongs to 3rd century CE (approximately 1,800 years old), is the oldest available inscription in Malayalam, as they contain two modern Malayalam words, Ee (This) and Pazhama (Old), those are not found even in the Oldest form of Tamil. The origin of Malayalam calendar dates back to year 825 CE. It is generally agreed that the Quilon Syrian copper plates of 849/850 CE is the available oldest inscription written in Old Malayalam. For the first 600 years of Malayalam calendar, the literature mainly consisted of the oral Ballads such as Vadakkan Pattukal (Northern Songs) in North Malabar and Thekkan Pattukal (Southern songs) in Southern Travancore. The earliest known literary works in Malayalam are Ramacharitam and Thirunizhalmala, two epic poems written in Old Malayalam. Malayalam literature has been presented with 6 Jnanapith awards, the second-most for any Dravidian language and the third-highest for any Indian language.

Designated a "Classical Language in India" in 2013, it developed into the current form mainly by the influence of the poets Cherusseri Namboothiri (Born near Kannur), Thunchaththu Ezhuthachan (Born near Tirur), and Poonthanam Nambudiri (Born near Perinthalmanna), in the 15th and the 16th centuries of Common Era. Kunchan Nambiar, a Palakkad-based poet also influnced a lot in the growth of modern Malayalam literature in its pre-mature form, through a new literary branch called Thullal. The prose literature, criticism, and Malayalam journalism, began following the latter half of 18th century CE.  The first travelogue in any Indian language is the Malayalam Varthamanappusthakam, written by Paremmakkal Thoma Kathanar in 1785.

The Triumvirate of poets (Kavithrayam: Kumaran Asan, Vallathol Narayana Menon and Ulloor S. Parameswara Iyer) are recognized for moving Keralite poetry away from archaic sophistry and metaphysics and towards a more lyrical mode. In 19th century Chavara Kuriakose Elias, the founder of Carmelites of Mary Immaculate and Congregation of Mother of Carmel congregations, contribute different streams in the Malayalam Literature. All his works are written between 1829 and 1870. Chavara's contribution to Malayalam literature includes, Chronicles, Poems – athmanuthapam (compunction of the soul), Maranaveettil Paduvanulla Pana (Poem to sing in the bereaved house) and Anasthasiayude Rakthasakshyam – and other Literary works . Contemporary Malayalam literature deals with social, political, and economic life context. The tendency of the modern poetry is often towards political radicalism. The writers like Kavalam Narayana Panicker have contributred much to Malayalam drama. In the second half of the 20th century, Jnanpith winning poets and writers like G. Sankara Kurup, S. K. Pottekkatt, Thakazhi Sivasankara Pillai, M. T. Vasudevan Nair, O. N. V. Kurup, and Akkitham Achuthan Namboothiri, had made valuable contributions to the modern Malayalam literature. Later, writers like O. V. Vijayan, Kamaladas, M. Mukundan, Arundhati Roy, and Vaikom Muhammed Basheer, have gained international recognition.

Arabi Malayalam (also called Mappila Malayalam and Moplah Malayalam) was the traditional Dravidian language of the Mappila Muslim community in Malabar Coast. The poets like Moyinkutty Vaidyar and Pulikkottil Hyder have made notable contributions to the Mappila songs, which is a genre of the Arabi Malayalam literature. The Arabi Malayalam script, otherwise known as the Ponnani script, is a writing system - a variant form of the Arabic script with special orthographic features - which was developed during the early medieval period and used to write Arabi Malayalam until the early 20th century CE. Though the script originated and developed in Kerala, today it is predominantly used in Malaysia and Singapore by the migrant Muslim community.

The modern Malayalam grammar is based on the book Kerala Panineeyam written by A. R. Raja Raja Varma in late 19th century CE. World Malayali Council with its sister organisation, International Institute for Scientific and Academic Collaboration (IISAC) has come out with a comprehensive book on Kerala titled 'Introduction to Kerala Studies,’ specially intended for the Malayali diaspora across the globe. J.V. Vilanilam, former Vice-Chancellor of the University of Kerala; Sunny Luke, medical scientist and former professor of Medical Biotechnology at Adelphi University, New York; and Antony Palackal, professor of Sociology at the Loyola College of Social Sciences in Thiruvananthapuram, have edited the book, besides making other contributions to it.

Tharavadu

Tharavadu is a system of joint family practiced by Malayalis, especially castes that belong to Namboothiris, Nairs, Thiyyar, Ambalavasis and Christians other prominent ethnoreligious groups. Each Tharavadu has a unique name. The Tharavadu was administered by the Karanavar, the oldest male member of the family. He would be the eldest maternal uncle of the family as well. The members of the Tharavadu consisted of mother, daughters, sons, sisters and brothers. The fathers and husbands had a very minimal role to play in the affairs of the Tharavadu. It was a true matrilineal affair. The Karanavar took all major decisions. He was usually autocratic. However, the consent of the eldest female member of the family was taken before implementing the decisions. This eldest female member would be his maternal grandmother, own mother, mother's sister, his own sister or a sister through his maternal lineage. Since the lineage was through the female members, the birth of a daughter was always welcomed. Each Tharavadu also has a Para Devatha (clan deity) revered by those in the particular Tharavadu. Temples were built to honour these deities.

Kerala's society is less patriarchal than the rest of India. Certain Hindu communities such as the Nairs, and Muslims around Kannur, and Ponnani in Malappuram, and Varkala and Edava in Thiruvananthapuram used to follow a traditional matrilineal system known as marumakkathayam which has in the recent years (post-Indian independence) ceased to exist. Christians, majority of the Muslims, and some Hindu castes such as the Namboothiris and some Ezhavas follow makkathayam, a patrilineal system. Kerala's gender relations are among the most equitable in India and the Majority World.

Architecture

Kerala, the ancestral land of the Malayali people, has a tropical climate with excessive rains and intensive solar radiation. The architecture of this region has evolved to meet these climatic conditions by having the form of buildings with low walls, sloping roof and projecting caves. The setting of the building in the open garden plot was again necessitated by the requirement of wind for giving comfort in the humid climate.

Timber is the prime structural material abundantly available in many varieties in Kerala. Perhaps the skillful choice of timber, accurate joinery, artful assembly, and delicate carving of the woodwork for columns, walls and roofs frames are the unique characteristics of Malayali architecture. From the limitations of the materials, a mixed-mode of construction was evolved in Malayali architecture. The stonework was restricted to the plinth even in important buildings such as temples. Laterite was used for walls. The roof structure in timber was covered with palm leaf thatching for most buildings and rarely with tiles for palaces or temples. The Kerala murals are paintings with vegetable dyes on wet walls in subdued shades of brown. The indigenous adoption of the available raw materials and their transformation as enduring media for architectural expression thus became the dominant feature of the Malayali style of architecture.

Nalukettu
Nalukettu was a housing style in Kerala. Nalukettu is a quadrangular building constructed after following the Tachu Sastra (Science of Carpentry). It was a typical house that was flanked by out-houses and utility structures. The large house-Nalukettu is constructed within a large compound. It was called Nalukettu because it consisted of four wings around a central courtyard called Nadumuttom. The house has a quadrangle in the center. The quadrangle is in every way the center of life in the house and very useful for the performance of rituals. The layout of these homes was simple, and catered to the dwelling of numerous people, usually part of a tharavadu. Ettukettu (eight halls with two central courtyards) or Pathinarukettu (sixteen halls with four central courtyards) are the more elaborate forms of the same architecture.

An example of a Nalukettu structure is Mattancherry Palace.

Performing arts and music

Malayalis use two words to denote dance, which is attom and thullal. The art forms of Malayalis are classified into three types: religious, such as Theyyam and Bhagavatipattu; semi religious, like Sanghakali and Krishnanattom; and secular, such as Kathakali, Mohiniyattam, and Thullal. Kathakali and Mohiniyattam are the two classical dance forms from Kerala. Kathakali is actually a dance-drama. Mohiniyattam is a very sensual and graceful dance form that is performed both solo and in a group by women. Kutiyattam is a traditional performing art form from Kerala, which is recognised by UNESCO and given the status Masterpieces of Oral and Intangible Heritage of Humanity. Ottamthullal is another performing art, which is also known as the poor man's Kathakali, which was created by the poet Kunchan Nambiar as an alternative to Chakiarkooth (another performing art), which was open only for higher castes to see. Theyyam is a ritualistic art form of Malayalis, which is thought to predate hinduism and to have developed from folk dances performed in conjunction with harvest celebrations. Theyyam is performed as an offering to gods so as to get rid of poverty and illness. Velakali is another ritualistic art form, mainly performed at temples in the festival time. Kolkali is a folk art in which dance performers move in a circle, striking small sticks and keeping rhythm with special steps.

Many ancient Malayali family houses in Kerala have special snake shrines called Kavu. Sarpam Thullal is usually performed in the courtyard of houses having snake shrines. This is a votive offering for family wealth and happiness. Kerala Natanam ( കേരള നടനം ) (Kerala Dance) is a new style of dance that is now recognized as a distinct classical art form evolved from Kathakali. The Indian dancer Guru Gopinath ( ഗുരു ഗോപിനാഥ്‌ ) a well-trained Kathakali artist and his wife Thankamani Gopinath developed this unique form of dance.

Performing arts in Kerala is not limited to a single religion of the Malayali society. Muslim Mappilas, Nasranis and Latin Christians have their own unique performing art forms. Duff Muttu, also known as Dubh Muttu/Aravanamuttu is a performing art form prevalent among the Muslim community. It is a group performance, staged as a social event during festivals and nuptial ceremonies.

Oppana is a popular form of social entertainment among the Muslim community. It is a form accompanied by clapping of hands, in which both men and women participate.

Margamkali is a performing art which is popular among the Saint Thomas Christians. It combines both devotion and entertainment, and was performed by men in groups. Since 1980's women also have found groups. The dancers themselves sing the margamkali songs in unison call and response form. Parichamuttukali is another performing art which is popular among Saint Thomas Christians. This is an artistic adaptation of the martial art of Kerala, Kalaripayattu. Chavittu nadakom is a theatrical art form observed mainly by Kerala Latin Christians, dating back to the second half of the 16th century.

However, many of these native art forms largely play to tourists or at youth festivals, and are not as popular among ordinary Keralites. Thus, more contemporary forms – including those heavily based on the use of often risqué and politically incorrect mimicry and parody – have gained considerable mass appeal in recent years. Indeed, contemporary artists often use such modes to mock socioeconomic elites. Since 1930 when the first Malayalam film Vigathakumaran was released and over the following decade or two, Malayalam Cinema had grown to become one of the popular means of expression for both works of fiction and social issues, and it remains so.

Music formed a major part of early Malayalam literature, which is believed to have started developing by 9th century CE. The significance of music in the culture of Kerala can be established just by the fact that in Malayalam language, musical poetry was developed long before prose. Kerala is musically known for Sopanam. Sopanam is religious in nature, and developed through singing invocatory songs at the Kalam of Kali, and later inside temples. Sopanam came to prominence in the wake of the increasing popularity of Jayadeva's Gita Govinda or Ashtapadis. Sopana sangeetham (music), as the very name suggests, is sung by the side of the holy steps (sopanam) leading to the sanctum sanctorum of a shrine. It is sung, typically employing plain notes, to the accompaniment of the small, hourglass-shaped ethnic drum called idakka, besides the chengila or the handy metallic gong to sound the beats.

Sopanam is traditionally sung by men of the Maarar and Pothuval community, who are Ambalavasi (semi-Brahmin) castes engaged to do it as their hereditary profession. Kerala is also home of Carnatic music. Legends like Swati Tirunal, Shadkala Govinda Maarar, Sangitha Vidwan Gopala Pillai Bhagavathar, Chertala Gopalan Nair, M. D. Ramanathan, T.V.Gopalakrishnan, M.S. Gopalakrishnan, L. Subramaniam T.N. Krishnan & K. J. Yesudas are Malayali musicians. Also among the younger generations with wide acclaim and promise is Child Prodigy Violinist L. Athira Krishna etc., who are looked upon as maestros of tomorrow.

Kerala also has a significant presence of Hindustani music as well. The king of Travancore, Swathi Thirunal patronaged and contributed much to the Hindustani Music. The pulluvar of Kerala are closely connected to the serpent worship. One group among these people consider the snake gods as their presiding deity and performs certain sacrifices and sing songs. This is called Pulluvan Pattu. The song conducted by the pulluvar in serpent temples and snake groves is called Sarppapaattu, Naagam Paattu, Sarpam Thullal, Sarppolsavam, Paambum Thullal or Paambum Kalam. Mappila Paattukal or Mappila Songs are folklore Muslim devotional songs in the Malayalam language. Mappila songs are composed in colloquial Malayalam and are sung in a distinctive tune. They are composed in a mixture of Malayalam and Arabic.

Film music, which refers to playback singing in the context of Indian music, forms the most important canon of popular music in India. Film music of Kerala in particular is the most popular form of music in the state.

Vallam Kali

Vallam Kali, is the race of country-made boats. It is mainly conducted during the season of the harvest festival Onam in Autumn. Vallam Kali include races of many kinds of traditional boats of Kerala. The race of Chundan Vallam (snake boat) is the major item. Hence Vallam Kali is also known in English as Snake Boat Race and a major tourist attraction. Other types of boats which do participate in various events in the race are Churulan Vallam, Iruttukuthy Vallam, Odi Vallam, Veppu Vallam (Vaipu Vallam), Vadakkanody Vallam, and Kochu Vallam. Nehru Trophy Boat Race is one of the famous Vallam Kali held in Punnamada Lake in Alappuzha district of Kerala. Champakulam Moolam Boat Race is the oldest and most popular Vallam Kali in Kerala. The race is held on river Pamba on the moolam day (according to the Malayalam Era) of the Malayalam month Midhunam, the day of the installation of the deity at the Ambalappuzha Sree Krishna Temple. The Aranmula Boat Race takes place at Aranmula, near a temple dedicated to Lord Krishna and Arjuna. The President's Trophy Boat Race is a popular event conducted in Ashtamudi Lake in Kollam.

Thousands of people gather on the banks of the river Pamba to watch the snake boat races. Nearly 50 snake boats or chundan vallams participate in the festival. Payippad Jalotsavam is a three-day water festival. It is conducted in Payippad Lake which is 35 km from Alappuzha district of Kerala state. There is a close relation between this Payippad boat race and Subramanya Swamy Temple in Haripad. Indira Gandhi Boat Race is a boat race festival celebrated in the last week of December in the backwaters of Kochi, a city in Kerala. This boat race is one of the most popular Vallam Kali in Kerala. This festival is conducted to promote Kerala tourism.

Festivals

Malayalis celebrate a variety of festivals, namely Onam, Vishu, Deepavali, and Christmas.

Cuisine

Malayali cuisine is not homogeneous and regional variations are visible throughout. Spices form an important ingredient in almost all curries. Kerala is known for its traditional , a vegetarian meal served with boiled rice and a host of side-dishes. The  is, as per custom, served on a banana leaf. Coconut is an essential ingredient in most of the food items and is liberally used.

 is a culinary specialty in Kerala. It is a steamed rice cake which is a favorite breakfast of most Malayalis. It is served with either brown chickpeas cooked in a spicy gravy,  and boiled small green lentils, or tiny ripe yellow Kerala plantains. It consists of two sections. The lower bulkier portion is where the water for steaming is stored. The upper detachable leaner portion is separated from the lower portion by perforated lids so as to allow the steam to pass through and bake the rice powder.

 is a pancake made of fermented batter. The batter is made of rice flour and fermented using either yeast or toddy, the local spirit. It is fried using a special frying pan called  and is served with egg curry, chicken curry, mutton stew, vegetable curry and chickpea curry.

Muslim cuisine or Mappila cuisine is a blend of traditional Kerala, Persian, Yemenese and Arab food culture. This confluence of culinary cultures is best seen in the preparation of most dishes. Kallummakkaya (mussels) curry, Irachi Puttu (Irachi means meat), parottas (soft flatbread), Pathiri (a type of rice pancake) and ghee rice are some of the other specialties. The characteristic use of spices is the hallmark of Mappila cuisine. spices like black pepper, cardamom and clove are used profusely. The Kerala Biryani, is also prepared by the community.
 	
The snacks include Unnakkaya (deep-fried, boiled ripe banana paste covering a mixture of cashew, raisins and sugar), pazham nirachathu (ripe banana filled with coconut grating, molasses or sugar), Muttamala made of eggs, Chattipathiri, a dessert made of flour, like baked, layered Chapatis with rich filling, Arikkadukka and so on.

Martial arts

Malayalis have their own form of martial arts called Kalaripayattu. This type of martial arts was used as a defensive mechanism against intruders. In ancient times, disputes between nobles (naaduvazhis or Vazhunors) were also settled by the outcome of a Kalaripayattu tournament. This ancient martial art is claimed as the mother of all martial arts. The word "kalari" can be traced to ancient Sangam literature.

Anthropologists estimate that Kalarippayattu dates back to at least the 12th century CE. The historian Elamkulam Kunjan Pillai attributes the birth of Kalaripayattu to an extended period of warfare between the Cheras and the Cholas in the 11th century CE. What eventually crystallized into this style is thought to have been a product of existing South Indian styles of combat, combined with techniques brought by other cultures. Kalaripayattu may be one of the oldest martial arts in existence. The oldest western reference to Kalaripayattu is a 16th-century travelogue of Duarte Barbosa, a Portuguese explorer. The southern style, which stresses the importance of hand-to-hand combat, is slightly different than Kalari in the north.

See also
 Malabars
 Non Resident Keralites Affairs
 World Malayalee Council
 Kerala Gulf diaspora
 Ethnic groups in Kerala
 Malaysian Malayali
 Migrant labourers in Kerala
Malayali Australian
Garshom International Awards

References

Further reading

External links

  Official site of Kerala Government
 Malayalam Resource Centre

Kerala society

Malayali diaspora
Malayali organizations
Dravidian peoples
Ethnic groups in India
Linguistic groups of the constitutionally recognised official languages of India